II is the second album recorded by Seven Thorns. It was released on 19 January 2013 independently, and was later re-released on 1 February 2014 by the record label Sonic Revolution. Despite being the band's lead singer, Gustav Blide performed only backing vocals for the album as he was not yet ready to cover the lead singing duties at the time. Lead vocals are performed by Erik Blomkvist like on the band's previous album. 
The chorus melody of the song Justice is based on a Danish church psalm with music composed by C. Chr. Hoffmann in 1878.

Track listing

Personnel
Lars Borup - Drums
Gabriel Tuxen - Guitars, backing vocals
Christian B. Strøjer - Guitars
Asger  W. Nielsen - Keyboards, backing vocals
Nicolaj Marker - Bass
Erik "EZ" Blomkvist - Lead vocals
Gustav Blide - Backing vocals
Mik Holm - backing vocals

Guest musicians
André Andersen (Royal Hunt) - Keyboard solo on Eye of the Storm.
David Henriksson (Heel, ex-Insania) - Additional lead vocals on Redemption.

Production
Peter Brander - Recording and mixing
Tommy Hansen - Mastering

2014 albums
Seven Thorns albums
Power metal albums by Danish artists